Võ Vân Ánh (born Hanoi), also known by the English name order Vân Ánh Võ and the stage name Vanessa Vo is a California-based Vietnamese musician best known for her work on the đàn tranh zither.
 
Among her accomplishments are the 2009 Emmy Award-winning soundtrack for the documentary Bolinao 52, which she co-composed and recorded, and as a session musician for the Sundance best documentary and 2003 Academy Awards nominee Daughter from Danang. Võ also co-composed and recorded for the documentary A Village Called Versailles, winner of the New Orleans Film Festival Audience Award.

Võ began studying đàn tranh from the age of four, and graduated with distinction from and taught at the Vietnam Academy of Music. In 1995, Võ won championship in the Vietnam National Dan Tranh Competition along with the first prize for best solo performance of modern folk music.

In addition to đàn tranh, Võ also performs as soloist on the đàn bầu monochord, the đàn tam thập lục 36-string hammered dulcimer, the đàn t'rưng bamboo xylophone, the klông pút, traditional trống drums, and Chinese guzheng.

She has also taught her daughter to play the đàn tranh.

References

External links
Vân-Ánh Vanessa Võ's Website
Bolinao 52
Daughter from Danang
Vo Van Anh inserts zither into New Age

American people of Vietnamese descent
Vietnamese musicians
Guzheng players
Living people

Year of birth missing (living people)